Francis Farquharson (1805–1878) was a Scottish architect/builder operational throughout the mid 19th century.

Life

He was born in Auchterarder on 21 October 1805. He was trained as a builder and began also doing design work, but does not appear to have had any formal training in architecture.

He moved to Haddington, East Lothian in 1833 to oversee the design and building of the County Buildings there, and settled there thereafter. In 1863 he became Provost of the town.

He died on 16 December 1878 and is buried in the churchyard of St Mary's Collegiate Church, Haddington, against the northern wall.

Known Works
Moulin Church, Pitlochry (1829)
County Buildings, Haddington, East Lothian (1833)
Monkrigg House, Haddington (1834)
Corn Exchange, Haddington (1853)
Involvement in Kingston House near Dirleton (1859) possibly unbuilt
North wing, Seacliffe House, North Berwick (1863)
Manse and Schoolhouse, Gladsmuir (1871)
Joiners Workshop, Whittingehame (1875) now restored as cottages

Family

He was married to Jessie Richardson. His two sons, John Farquharson and Robert Farquharson were also architects. Robert suffered from mental health problems and shot himself in 1891.

References

1805 births
1878 deaths
People from Perthshire
19th-century Scottish architects